Left Democrats can mean:

Democrats of the Left (Democratici di Sinistra) - a former political party in Italy
Left Democrats (Vänsterdemokraterna) - a former political party in Sweden
Left and Democrats (Lewica i Demokraci) - a former political alliance in Poland